Meriel de Jesus, who goes by the mononym Mrld (also stylized all caps, pronounced as individual letters), is a Filipina singer and songwriter. She signed a record deal with Kean Cipriano's label O/C Records / Viva Records, and released her debut track "An Art Gallery Could Never Be Unique As You" under that label in 2021. She gained mainstream popularity with "Art Gallery" as well as the song "Ligaya". In May 2022, she was featured on a billboard ad for Spotify on Women at Times Square.

Discography

Filmography

Music videos

Notes

References

External links 

Living people

Filipino singer-songwriters
Viva Records (Philippines) artists
People from Bogo, Cebu
Year of birth missing (living people)